Scoparia nipponalis is a moth in the family Crambidae. It was described by Inoue in 1982. It is found on the Japanese island of Hokkaido, the Chinese provinces of Henan and Shanxi and in Russia.

References

Moths described in 1982
Scorparia